The R240 road is a regional road in Ireland, located on the Inishowen Peninsula, County Donegal.

References

Regional roads in the Republic of Ireland
Roads in County Donegal